The green shrike-babbler (Pteruthius xanthochlorus) is a bird species that was earlier placed in the family Timaliidae. The species is now considered to be an Asian offshoot of the American vireos and belongs in the family Vireonidae.

Description
This species is about 13 centimeters in length. The male bird has a grey head, with olive-green on its back. Its throat and breast are a pale ashy grey color, with a yellow belly. The crown is blackish. The female bird is slightly duller than the male and has a greyish crown.

Distribution and habitat
It is found in Bhutan, China, India, Myanmar, Nepal, Pakistan, and Vietnam. Its natural habitat is subtropical or tropical moist montane forests. This species is usually found in deciduous and coniferous forests, at altitudes of 2100–3000 meters above sea level, during most seasons. However, they may descend to lower altitudes in winter. In India, the species is found in Darjeeling, Sikkim, Uttrakhand and Arunachal Pradesh.

Diet
The diet consists of insects such as ants and beetles as well as berries and seeds.

Breeding
The breeding season is mainly May and June. The nests are usually found about three to eight meters above the ground.

References

Collar, N. J. & Robson, C. 2007. Family Timaliidae (Babblers)  pp. 70 – 291 in; del Hoyo, J., Elliott, A. & Christie, D.A. eds. Handbook of the Birds of the World, Vol. 12. Picathartes to Tits and Chickadees. Lynx Edicions, Barcelona.

green shrike-babbler
Birds of the Himalayas
Birds of China
Birds of Northeast India
Birds of Yunnan
green shrike-babbler
green shrike-babbler
green shrike-babbler
Taxonomy articles created by Polbot